Moon Won-joo is a South Korean actor. He is best known for his roles in dramas such as Hot Stove League, Nokdu Flower and Golden Apple. He also appeared in movies My Girl and I, The Cut and Attack the Gas Station 2.

Filmography

Television series

Film

References

External links
 
 

1980 births
Living people
21st-century South Korean male actors
South Korean male television actors
South Korean male film actors